Jeannine Burch (born 19 January 1968 in Zürich, Switzerland) is a Swiss television actress. Currently she lives in Düsseldorf, Germany.

Selected filmography
1997 "Pretty Babe"
1990 "Der Strohmann"
1990 "Der doppelte Nötzli"
1990 "Der Tangospieler" (The Tango Player)

External links

proAct Agency Cologne 

Swiss television actresses
1968 births
Living people